Nia Tsholofelo Künzer (born 18 January 1980) is a retired German women's football player.

Early life
She was born in Mochudi, Botswana, as Nia Tsholofelo Künzer (her first name being Swahili for "aim" or "intention" and her second name being Tswana for "hope"), where her parents were on a two-year tour with a development aid organization. She grew up in the Albert-Schweitzer-Kinderdorf (children's village) in Wetzlar-Garbenheim, alongside her brother and seven foster children. After the Abitur, she did a year of practical training in social work in a kindergarten for handicapped children. In 2008, she completed a degree in education science (German title Diplompädagogin) at the Justus Liebig University Giessen.

Career

 
Having a history as a high jumper, and after being a member of football clubs Eintracht Wetzlar and VfB Gießen she was with 1. FFC Frankfurt (1st Frankfurt Women's Football Club) starting 1997. She played as a defender or midfielder. Künzer retired in July 2008 from professional football after an injury.

International career
Her Golden Goal in the final match against Sweden made Germany the winner of the 2003 World Cup and was to become the first ever women's "Goal of the Year" in the history of German football. When together with her team-mates she stood on the balcony of the Frankfurter Römer, to be welcomed by thousands of fans, it also marked the end of German women's football long sleep of 30 years, with the news media taking more than marginal interest and the first major sponsors (e.g. Katjes Fassin) appearing on the scene. (Since 2007, FIFA restored the tie-breaking format, with teams playing two straight 15-minute extra time periods before the game goes to penalty kicks.)

She actively promotes the idea of women's soccer and helps in recruiting from the next generation of enthusiastic young girls.

During the winter of 2003/2004 she had to pause for several weeks due to one more cruciate ligament injury, which meant she was not available for the Olympic Games 2004 in Athens, Greece. A fourth cruciate ligament injury forced Künzer to resign from the national team in 2006.

International goals

TV career
Künzer also works as a TV sports commentator. She is Das Erste's main pundit for their comprehensive coverage of games involving the national team as well as for major women's tournaments like World Cups, Euros and the Algarve Cup.

References

External links
 Nia Künzer (personal homepage)
 Deutscher Fußball-Bund (German Soccer Assn) (portrait Nia Künzer)
 FIFA Women's World Cup (portrait Nia Künzer, in German)
 The San Diego Union-Tribune ("Heads-up Germany stuns Sweden" – October 13, 2003)
 Westdeutscher Rundfunk (audio in German: "Arrival in Frankfurt" – October 14, 2003)
 

1980 births
Living people
People from Wetzlar
Sportspeople from Giessen (region)
University of Giessen alumni
German women's footballers
Germany women's international footballers
1. FFC Frankfurt players
2003 FIFA Women's World Cup players
FIFA Women's World Cup-winning players
Women's association football defenders
Women's association football midfielders
People from Kgatleng District
Footballers from Hesse